Ulviyya Hamzayeva (born 30 April 1982) is a politician and painter from Azerbaijan.

Education
Hamzayeva graduated from Nakhchivan State University in 2003. She is an author of monument raised in Nakhchivan to Genocide of Azerbaijanians. Studied MA in Arts and currently pursuing a PhD.

Career
Ulviyya has been teaching art and art history in Nakhchivan State University since 2005. She has been awarded with the title “Honored Artist of Nakhchivan Autonomous Republic” in 2008. In 2009 she was awarded with the title “Honored Artist of Azerbaijan Republic” by President of Azerbaijan Republic. Ulviyya Hamzayeva has been elected as Chairman of “Artists Union of Nakhchivan Autonomous Republic” in February 2011.  Since 2013 she is real member of World Academy of Arts "New Era". Ulviyya Hamzayeva is a Member of National Assembly of Azerbaijan Republic since 2015. Her works belong to local museums, private and public collections.

References

External links 
Peace Monuments Related to All Genocides

1982 births
Living people
Nakhchivan State University alumni
21st-century Azerbaijani women politicians
21st-century Azerbaijani politicians
Women members of the National Assembly (Azerbaijan)
Members of the National Assembly (Azerbaijan)
21st-century Azerbaijani painters